Mikuláš Kucsera (10 June 1902 – 28 May 1987) was a Slovak athlete. He competed in the men's high jump at the 1924 Summer Olympics. His main rival in the 1920s was Štefan Stanislay.

Personal bests
High jump – 186 cm (1923)

References

External links
 

1902 births
1987 deaths
Athletes (track and field) at the 1924 Summer Olympics
Slovak male high jumpers
Olympic athletes of Czechoslovakia
Athletes from Budapest